Harinder Pal Singh Sandhu (born 31 March 1989 in Chandigarh), known as Harinder Pal Sandhu, is a professional squash player who represents India. He reached a career-high world ranking of World No. 47 in April 2018.

He was a part of the Indian team, who won the gold medal at the 2014 Asian Games held at Incheon. Harinder Pal Singh Sandhu won the first match 11-8, 11-6, 8-11, 11-4 against Mohd Azlan Iskandar of Malaysia and gave India a 1-0 lead over Malaysia, after which Saurav Ghosal won the second match, thus providing India with the gold medal in Men's Team event.

References

External links 
 
 
 

1989 births
Living people
Racket sportspeople from Chandigarh
Indian male squash players
Asian Games medalists in squash
Asian Games gold medalists for India
Asian Games bronze medalists for India
Squash players at the 2010 Asian Games
Squash players at the 2014 Asian Games
Squash players at the 2018 Asian Games
Medalists at the 2010 Asian Games
Medalists at the 2014 Asian Games
Medalists at the 2018 Asian Games
Commonwealth Games competitors for India
Squash players at the 2010 Commonwealth Games
Squash players at the 2014 Commonwealth Games
Squash players at the 2018 Commonwealth Games
South Asian Games silver medalists for India
South Asian Games bronze medalists for India
South Asian Games medalists in squash
Competitors at the 2013 World Games
Squash players at the 2022 Commonwealth Games